Touchback is a 2011 American sports film written and directed by Don Handfield. It stars Brian Presley, Melanie Lynskey, Kurt Russell and Christine Lahti. It premiered on home video in Finland and Sweden on September 28, 2011, and had a limited theatrical run in the United States the following year. The film received mixed reviews from critics.

Plot
Scott Murphy is a former high school football hero. An injury he received during the Ohio State High School Championship game terminated his scholarship to Ohio State University and his dreams of a professional career in football. It's been twenty years since that game and Scott still resides with his family in the quiet town of Coldwater, Ohio. He has a splinted leg and has been a farmer and volunteer firefighter since high school. Rather than marrying the head cheerleader, Scott marries and has two daughters with a clarinet-playing band member named Macy. A compromised harvest and bank obligations have caused a strain on his farm, which he is in jeopardy of losing. With bad luck around every corner, Scott is not mentally prepared for the game in which he will be honored  (in a halftime ceremony), and the return of his good friend Hall who made the NFL and married Scott's old high school girlfriend only adds to the depression he is feeling. An early frost and a broken soybean header bring Scott to the brink. His wife, Macy, suggests that they could pick the soybeans by hand in order to bring them to market. Scott finds this far-fetched since there are 200 acres to combine (harvest). He decides to kill himself via carbon monoxide (CO) poisoning in his truck. As he passes out, Scott wakes up back in 1991, on the eve of the big game.

Scott embraces his return, as he is able to spend time with his hard-working mother. One last recruiting meeting with scouts from OSU enlightens Scott as the scout admits the game will be hard, and that if he so chooses, sitting out will not impact his invitation to joining the quarterback unit at OSU. Scott introduces himself to Macy and tries to share with her what is happening with him. With the championship game upon him, he informs Coach Hand (played by Kurt Russell) that he will not play in the big game which will undo the events which have directly led to his pain and misery. Coach offers a speech about the merits of the people of Coldwater. Coach Hand shares with Scott how he receives a job offer from OSU annually only to turn it down out of love for Coldwater and its inhabitants. As Scott lives through the events leading up to the game, he decides he will play after all. While Scott's efforts on the field keep the game close, Coach Hand encourages him to share the ball with his teammates. In the second half, Scott mixes it up a bit and with "the play" imminent, Scott tells his coach he will not run the pitch-fake which ultimately causes his leg to be broken. Coach smiles and suggests a passing play, but informs Scott that based upon the Chief's defensive formation, he can call an audible as necessary, that it is his decision.

As Scott prepares to call for the hike, he looks over at his girlfriend, then looks out into the band bleachers, where he sees Macy. The clock runs down and Scott calls an audible, a running play where he maneuvers himself close enough to jump into the end zone. As he crosses, Scott is hammered by two defensive players, and his leg is shattered at the knee. Coldwater wins the Ohio State High School Championship game over the heavily favored Chiefs. Scott demonstrated that he is an intensely talented football player, as he basically, for the most part, single-handedly, beat a high school team that had eight players on defense already signed to NCAA Division I scholarships.

Scott comes to in his truck, his suicide attempt failed due to his truck running out of gas. As he walks to town, he sees it is desolate — even the football field is absent of any people or players. As he makes a turn for his farm, he sees his soybean field crowded with all the citizens of Coldwater. They heard about his hardship, his need for his crops to make it to market, and the people of Coldwater have stepped up to return the favor … in honor of the great Scott Murphy, the exceptional quarterback who gave Coldwater the 1991 Ohio State High School Championship. Scott decides to stop complaining about his life and he is happy about what he has and never regret it. He also decides to be an assistant coach to his old mentor coach. He also reunited with his wife and his two kids.

Main cast

 Brian Presley as Scott Murphy
 Melanie Lynskey as Macy
 Kurt Russell as Coach Hand
 Marc Blucas as Hall
 Christine Lahti as Thelma
 Sarah Wright as Jenny
 Drew Powell as Dwight Pearson
 Kevin Covais as Todd White
 James Duval as Rodriguez
 Sianoa Smit-McPhee as Sasha

Production

Filming
Filming took place during July and August 2010. The primary filming location was Coopersville, Michigan at the Coopersville High School football stadium. Additional filming occurred in Grand Rapids, Ravenna Township and River View High School in Warsaw, Ohio. One scene was also filmed in Ohio Stadium on October 23, 2010 during an Ohio State football game. Touchback marked the first time Ohio Stadium and Coopersville High School stadium had been shown in a major motion picture.

The film had limited distribution and disappointing box office sales. It was distributed domestically by Anchor Bay and in China by Bliss Media.

Reception
On Rotten Tomatoes, the film has an approval rating of 38% based on reviews from 13 critics.

Joe Leydon of Variety called it "A lightweight and overlong feel-good drama that plays like a mashup of It's a Wonderful Life and Friday Night Lights."

References

External links
 

2012 films
American coming-of-age films
American drama films
American fantasy films
Class reunions in popular culture
Films set in 1991
Films set in 2006
Films set in Iowa
Films set in the 1990s
Films set in the 2000s
Films shot in Michigan
Films shot in Ohio
Films scored by William Ross
Films about time travel
High school football films
MoviePass Films films
2010s high school films
2012 drama films
2010s English-language films
2010s American films